The Vladivostok Biennale of Visual Arts is an international festival of contemporary and modern visual art, held every two years in Vladivostok, Russia. The first Biennale was held in April, 1998 in Vladivostok. Then there was presented theatre art only, but after that first Biennale there were made a decision to move beyond the theatre Biennale and turn it into Biennale of visual arts. The founder and organizer of the Vladivostok Biennale is Vladivostok city's administration of Primorsky Krai. An event is sought to rapprochement of Russian and Asia-Pacific region's culture.

1998 Biennale 
The first Biennale was held in April, 1998 under the motto "From the world of theater - to the theater of peace" and gathered in Vladivostok more than 150 participants from Russia, Japan, USA, Korea, China, Germany, Vietnam, New Zealand. Their skills demonstrated 9 theaters from Japan and Russia. The result of the first Biennale in Vladivostok was foundation of the International Theatre Institute of Stanislavski, which included Japanese, Russian, American people. Then there was presented theatre art only, but after that first Biennale there were made a decision to move beyond the theatre Biennale and turn it into Biennale of visual arts.

2000 Biennale 
Second Vladivostok Biennale of Visual Arts was held in 2000 under the theme "Creativity - the language of mutual understanding". It was devoted to the 140th anniversary of Vladivostok and the 140th anniversary of Chekhov. Biennale have gathered over 300 participants from Japan, South Korea, the United States and united theater and museum workers, folklore collectives, artists and architects.

The museum program included competitions of exhibitions, which showed modern level of exposure work of museums and galleries, family albums contest, which were attended by individuals; competition of decorative and applied arts and workshops of traditional crafts and folk festival.

2003 Biennale 
The third Biennale was held under the motto "To the man, to the city and to the world" from June 30 to July 6, 2003, and gathered in Vladivostok more than 200 participants from Russia and Japan. The year 2003 was declared by the President of Russia V.V. Putin a year of Japan cultire in Russia. Theatre workers, representatives of the music groups from Russia and Japan, museum professionals from Yakutia, Ust-Orda Buryat Autonomous District, Jewish Autonomous Region and the cities of Primorsky Krai, artists from Japan and Russia demonstrated their skills. Master classes: "The art of Ikebana," "The Art of Calligraphy," "traditional Japanese clothes," "Traditional Slavic music" were held.

2005 Biennale 
IV Biennale was held from June 30 to July 6 under the motto "Art across the borders". International exposition program was presented by exhibition program "Vladivostok at the crossroads of time and space". V.K. Arsenyev Museum, N. Grodekov State Museum of Far East (Khabarovsk); G.S.Novikova-Daursky Amursky regional history museum; Municipal Museum of Hakodate presented their exhibitions.
At the exhibitions were also presented works of masters of calligraphy, ikebana, ceramics, embroidery, were carried out master classes: "Japanese handicraft 'Terimen', Japanese calligraphy, arranging flowers.
Music program included performances of folk groups from Russia, China, Japan, XIII Russian-Japanese musical meetings. As part of the Biennale were held a lot of theater performances, lectures, meetings, round tables. There was a meeting of representatives of the scientific community of Russia and Japan.

2007 Biennale 
The Fifth Biennale was timed to celebrate the birthday of Vladivostok. The main directions were:
 Art creativity - graphics, installation, sculpture entitled "Space - the present";
 Photography - art photography, photo montage on the theme 'City - a contemporary of mine ";
 Music art - instrumental, vocal on "The music of present sounds";
 National art - calligraphy, manga, ikebana, tea ceremony, kendo, and others on the theme "Vladivostok - East."

2009 Biennale 
Sixth Biennial of Visual Arts in Vladivostok gathered young authors and masters of culture from Russia, Japan, Vietnam, China, who presented their works in six program directions: art creativity (painting, graphics, installation), photography (art photography, photomontage, photo installation, video, photo projects, photo collage), national art (decorative and applied arts, calligraphy, comics manga, ikebana, tea ceremony), a musical and theatre arts, design, web design, art projects. Among the foreign participants were: artists from the Yanbian Korean Autonomous Region (China), Nanjing (China), Busan (South Korea), masters of folk arts and crafts "Bohai" Mudantszyan (China), and photographers from Japan, Vietnam, China, the actors from Japan and Vietnam. Russia was presented by guests from Magadan, Khabarovsk, Moscow and artists from all over Primorsky krai.

2011 Biennale 
7th Vladivostok Biennale of visual arts will be held from 11 to 15 of September. The main directions of Seventh Biennale are:
 cinematography,
 dramatics,
 video art,
 art,
 ethno.
The Biennale is open to Russian and foreign culture and art workers, separate authors and collectives with their projects, delegations may include authors, participants, organizers and curators of modern actual projects on the main topics of Biennale, artists, photographers, designers, sculptors, artists and actors, representatives of other creative professions of the sphere of art, culture and art workers, the officials that support actual creative projects.

Awarding 
Rewarding of participants is held on program activities and at the Closing Ceremony of Biennale. Participants are awarded with diplomas of Biennale, souvenirs and valuable gifts. The catalogue of activities is published.

Notes and references

External links
 Vladivostok Biennale site

Art biennials
Art exhibitions in Russia
Art festivals in Russia
Festivals in Russia
Recurring events established in 1998